Udawatte Nanda Thero (or Udawatte Nanda) is a Sri Lankan politician and a former member of the Parliament of Sri Lanka.

In the 2010 general election he contested from the Sri Lanka National Front in Kandy District but was not elected. During the campaign he criticized his former party, the JHU and said that it was hijacked by laymen.

References

Year of birth missing (living people)
Living people
Members of the 13th Parliament of Sri Lanka
Jathika Hela Urumaya politicians
United People's Freedom Alliance politicians